Municipalities in Brunei are settlements which have been incorporated by the government to run as municipalities. They are independent from the hierarchy of the country's subdivisions but nevertheless overlap with mukims and villages, the second- and third-level administrative divisions of Brunei. The governing body of a municipality is municipal department which is a government department under the Ministry of Home Affairs; the head is a chairman (officially ) which is equivalent to mayor.

List
There are four settlements in Brunei which have municipal status, namely Bandar Seri Begawan, the capital of Brunei; Kuala Belait, a town and capital of Belait District; Seria, a town also in Belait District; and Tutong, the town of Tutong District.

See also 
 Administrative divisions of Brunei

References